Perrenoud is a surname. Notable people with the surname include: 

François Perrenoud (born 1949), French speed skater
Marc Perrenoud (born 1981), Swiss jazz pianist and composer
Marie-Louise Perrenoud (born 1947), French speed skater